Avelino Rico (born 12 February 1931) is a Spanish carom billiards player. He won at the UMB World Three-cushion Championship in 1986, having a match against Torbjörn Blomdahl and Raymond Ceulemans. Rico also placed second at the CEB European Three-cushion Championship in 1986. He participated at the Spanish Championships, receiving ten wins.

References

External links 

1931 births
Living people
Place of birth missing (living people)
Spanish carom billiards players
Three-cushion billiards players
World champions in three-cushion billiards